Hong Kong True Light College (HKTLC) is a Christian girls secondary school in Ap Lei Chau, Hong Kong Island, Hong Kong.

History 
Harriet Newell Noyes, an American Christian missionary, founded True Light College in Guangzhou in 1872. Four schools are associated with True Light - Hong Kong True Light College, which were established from 1935 to 1973. In 1975, the Hong Kong True Light College was founded in Caine Road, and was later relocated to Ap Lei Chau in 1995. The Chinese name was also changed in 1999.

School motto 
 'Thou art the light of the world' (Matthew 5:14)

School badge 
 Star of Bethlehem

School ethos 
 Hong Kong True Light College is marked by the culture of simplicity. It aim at cultivating students' good character and implementing a Christian-based holistic education. In school, students need to wear a blue 'cheong-sam', a traditional costume for Chinese women. Students may wear short hair, plaits or pony-tails.

School song 
 'We sing of a school where we’re happy as can be, of course, we mean Chan Kwong. In our work and in our play, we’re as good as we can be, for the glory of Chan Kwong. In the days that have gone by, there were keepers of the light, good keepers at Chan Kwong. And in the coming time, we too will keep the light, keep it shining for Chan Kwong.
[REFRAIN]For the glory of Chan Kwong we’ll live, for the glory of Chan Kwong. In the days that are to be, we’ll be good as we can be, for the glory of Chan Kwong.'

Notable alumni 
 Elanne Kong, Hong Kong actress and singer

See also 
 True Light Middle School of Hong Kong
 True Light Girls' College
 Kowloon True Light Middle School
 Education in Hong Kong
 List of secondary schools in Hong Kong

References

External links 
 Official Website (In Traditional Chinese)
 Official Website (In English)

Protestant secondary schools in Hong Kong
Primary schools in Hong Kong
Southern District, Hong Kong
Girls' schools in Hong Kong